Joseph L. Zbacnik (July 11, 1937–February 12, 2020) was an American curler.

Zbacnik worked as a dentist, and employed the three members of his team at his clinic. He practiced dentistry in Moorhead, Minnesota and Dana Point, California. He was married to Kathleen and had three children.

Teams

References

External links
 
Full text of "Sports Illustrated 1966-04-04" (web archive) (page 43, "DOWNFALL OF A STONE-THROWER")
Barry Fry - Curling Legends Podcast: Episode 38 ("...and tales from his year as a hired player for Dr. Joe Zbacnik in Fargo, North Dakota")

1937 births
2020 deaths
American male curlers
American curling champions
Sportspeople from California